Harry Percy Bowyer (6 September 1909 – 17 November 1998) was an Australian rules footballer who played with Collingwood in the Victorian Football League (VFL).

Born in England, Bowyer was part of a strong Collingwood side during his career and played in four premiership teams. He played on a wing and back pocket in the 1929 and 1930 premierships, respectively, and in the ruck for their 1935 and 1936 premierships. Bowyer retired in 1938 after believing, wrongly, that he had a stomach ulcer.

References

External links

1909 births
1998 deaths
English emigrants to Australia
Australian rules footballers from Victoria (Australia)
Collingwood Football Club players
Collingwood Football Club Premiership players
VFL/AFL players born in England
Four-time VFL/AFL Premiership players